Waed Bilal Raed (born 9 November 2006) is a Lebanese footballer who plays as a left wing-back for Lebanese club SAS and the Lebanon national team.

Club career
Raed began playing football in the Shady Football Academy in 2015 as the only girl in the academy, before moving to Stars Association for Sports (SAS)'s youth sector. She scored her first senior goal in the Lebanese Women's Football League on 13 June 2021, in a 3–3 draw against BFA. On 29 June 2022, Raed joined Safa on loan to compete in the 2022 WAFF Women's Clubs Championship in Jordan; Safa eventually won the tournament after beating Orthodox of Jordan 3–1 in the final.

International career
Raed played for the Lebanon national under-15 team at the 2019 WAFF U-15 Championship, winning the tournament.

She made her senior international debut for Lebanon on 30 August 2021, as a half-time substitute in a 5–1 win against Sudan in the 2021 Arab Women's Cup. Raed was called up to represent Lebanon at the 2022 WAFF Women's Championship, helping her side finish runners-up.

Personal life
Raed supports Spanish club Barcelona and Lebanese club Ansar.

Honours 
Safa
 WAFF Women's Clubs Championship: 2022

SAS
 Lebanese Women's Football League: 2021–22

Lebanon U15
 WAFF U-15 Girls Championship: 2019

Lebanon U18
 WAFF U-18 Girls Championship: 2022

Lebanon
 WAFF Women's Championship runner-up: 2022

See also
 List of Lebanon women's international footballers

References

External links
 

2006 births
Living people
People from Baabda District
Lebanese women's footballers
Women's association football fullbacks
Stars Association for Sports players
Safa WFC players
Lebanese Women's Football League players
Lebanon women's youth international footballers
Lebanon women's international footballers